David McKenzie Wright (11 February 1874 – 24 August 1937) was a Conservative member of the House of Commons of Canada. He was born in Ayton, Ontario and became an industrialist.

Wright attended public and secondary schools at Mount Forest, then Central Business College in Stratford, Ontario. He was also a city councillor for Stratford at one time.

He operated the McLagan Furniture company and was president of Meaford Manufacturing. In 1929 and 1930, Wright served as Rotary International's Canadian director and during those same years also served on Ontario's provincial Royal Commission of Public Welfare. He was also a representative on the Niagara Falls Park Commission.

Wright was first elected to Parliament at the Perth North riding in the 1925 general election then defeated in the 1926 election. He won back the riding in 1930 and served the full term of the 17th Canadian Parliament before leaving federal politics.

References

External links
 

1874 births
1937 deaths
Members of the House of Commons of Canada from Ontario
Conservative Party of Canada (1867–1942) MPs
People from Grey County
People from Perth County, Ontario